General Viana (3 December 1913 – 6 November 1958) was a Uruguayan footballer. He played in nine matches for the Uruguay national football team from 1939 to 1945. He was also part of Uruguay's squad for the 1945 South American Championship.

References

External links
 

1913 births
1958 deaths
Uruguayan footballers
Uruguay international footballers
Uruguayan expatriate footballers
Expatriate footballers in Argentina
Association football midfielders
Central Español players
Boca Juniors footballers
Club Atlético Atlanta footballers
Club Nacional de Football players
Sud América players